A guitar controller is a video game controller designed to simulate the playing of the guitar, a string musical instrument. Guitar controllers are often used for music games such as UmJammer Lammy: NOW!, GuitarFreaks, Guitar Hero, and the Rock Band series. The controllers are played by holding down a colored fret button that matches a colored, on-screen note, while pressing the strum bar as the note passes through the target. The controllers also feature a whammy bar, which is used to bend notes and collect each game's equivalent of bonus energy. Different games and models of controllers have introduced additional features, such as effects switches, additional fret buttons, and fret touch pads. The fret buttons are colored usually in the order of (from lowest to highest pitch) green, red, yellow, blue, and orange.

The guitar design for Guitar Hero Live does not use the five colored frets, instead using two rows (one black and one white) with three buttons each.

Implementation as game controllers
A guitar controller is almost always an adaption of existing regular controller technologies for a given home video game console—all features of the guitar are implemented using features found on a standard game controller. Generally speaking, the following apply:

 Fret Buttons are implemented as the standard action buttons on the controller- for example, the buttons on a guitar controller for the Xbox 360 map to the face buttons and left shoulder buttons on the standard Xbox 360 controller.
 The whammy bar is implemented as an axis, used for menu navigation.
 The meta buttons (start, select, back) map directly to their standard controller counterparts.  A guitar controller for a Wii music game often conveniently has the meta buttons supplied by the Wii Remote itself, which is inserted into a conveniently shaped cavity in the controller.

Other vendor-specific features can be implemented using standard controls, or combinations of them. For example, the solo bar on a Rock Band guitar controller is implemented using the same controller buttons as the main fret buttons, plus an additional modifier key, whereas the Slide Bar from recent versions of Guitar Hero is simply another axis.  Guitar controllers also have a "gesture" feature in which the player can tilt or gently shake the guitar neck, which is used in most guitar games to activate a power-up mode, such as Star Power in Guitar Hero games or Overdrive in Rock Band games.  This function is also usually mapped to an axis, or the Wii Remote's motion sensors for Wii-based guitar controllers.

Variations

Guitar Hero (PlayStation 2) 
The Harmonix Guitar Hero Guitar Controller was a 3/4 scale replica of a Gibson SG. The controller has 5 buttons under the tuning pegs, on the neck of the guitar. These buttons are as follows: green, red, yellow, blue, and orange. Then, at the bottom of the guitar are as follows: a Start button, a Select button, a Whammy Bar, and a Strum bar.

Guitar Hero II (PlayStation 2 & Xbox 360) 
The Harmonix Guitar Hero 2 Guitar Controller has two different variations. The first being for the PlayStation 2 which has the same layout as the previous model, but the guitar's design is different. This guitar was based on a red Gibson SG.

Guitar Hero II was also released for Xbox 360 and had a separate design and layout. The design of the guitar resembles a Gibson X-Plorer with a layout of the head having the default 5 fret buttons, a Strum bar, and  a Whammy Bar, but now a button with the Xbox 360 Guide with 4 lights surrounding it (which represents which player your controller is), a D-Pad, a Back button, and a Start button.

Guitar Hero III: Legends of Rock (PlayStation 2 and 3, Wii, Xbox 360, Microsoft Windows, & Mac OS X) 
Guitar Hero III had 3 different types of guitars. 1 of them having 3 color designs. The first guitar was for the PlayStation 2. It resembled Gibson's Kramer model and had the same layout as its predecessor.

The guitar for Windows and Mac OS X was the same guitar that came with the Xbox 360's version of Guitar Hero II.

The PlayStation 3, Xbox 360, and Wii all had the same design, that resembled a Gibson Les Paul. The difference between the three was the color. The Wii came with a white body and a black head. The Wii's controller, unlike the other models, had a cut out for the Wii remote and would use the remote as its D-Pad, Start, Back, and Guide button. Although it still had a start and back button built into it. The Xbox 360's controller had the same layout as its predecessor, but the design was a black Gibson Les Paul. The PlayStation 3's controller had the same layout as the Xbox 360, but it was a slightly lighter black.

The Guitar Hero: On Tour trilogy (Nintendo DS) and the Nintendo DS version of Band Hero

Vicarious Visions developed a special guitar controller accessory for the Nintendo DS handheld, called the Guitar Grip, and it is used for a spin-off Guitar Hero trilogy subtitled On Tour, released exclusively for that platform, as well as the Nintendo DS version of Band Hero.  The Guitar Grip is a special attachment that connects to the DS' backwards compatible Game Boy Advance Game Pak slot (thus making the On Tour games incompatible with both Nintendo DSi models and the Nintendo 3DS family), allowing the player to hold the system sideways like an open book and use its bottom half as a guitar neck.  Four fret buttons on the attachment are positioned below the touchscreen, which is used to strum the guitar and play on-screen notes while any fret buttons are pressed. The Guitar Grip concept underwent many changes before Vicarious Visions was able to determine a comfortable design for it with great difficulty.

Guitar Hero World Tour (PlayStation 2 and 3, Wii, Xbox 360, Microsoft Windows, & Mac OS X) 
The Guitar for Guitar Hero World Tour was a new design that was the same across all consoles, except Wii which had a cut out for the Wii Remote. The new guitar though had some new features and improvements. First off, the guitar was 25% larger, making it closer to the size of a real guitar. Secondly, the guitar now has a longer whammy bar and a new Star Power button. Third, under the standard fret buttons, a touchpad was implemented letting players execute notes via tapping or also known as tap strumming. Connectivity issues were resolved. The design of the guitar was an original design created by the developers of Guitar Hero, but they took ideas from the Fender Stratocaster.

Guitar Hero 5 (PlayStation 2 and 3, Wii, & Xbox 360) 
The Guitar for Guitar Hero 5 was an adaptation of the Guitar Hero World Tour Guitar. The only changes to this one was a rubberized strum bar, the nuts on the head of the guitar were replaced with chrome instead of the plastic design, and the “Solo section” of the neck had a different mold and was converted from its analog design to digital.

Guitar Hero: Warriors of Rock (Xbox 360, PlayStation 3, & Wii) 
The guitar for Guitar Hero: Warriors of Rock was developed by Neversoft, the developers of Guitar Hero: Warriors of Rock. It was a huge redesign for the series as it looked like an ax rather than the classic design of electric guitars. The “Solo section” on the guitar was removed. The d-pad and guide button were merged into one.

Rock Band (Xbox 360, PlayStation 2 and 3, & Wii) 
The guitar for Rock Band is used for the lead guitar and bass gameplay. The guitar resembles a Fender Stratocaster. It is similar to the guitars from Guitar Hero as it pertains fret on the neck, a strum bar, and a whammy bar. Unlike its adversary, Guitar Hero, there were fret buttons at the bottom of the neck for tapping (A technique where a string is fretted and set into vibration as part of a single motion).

Rock Band 2 (Xbox 360, PlayStation 2 and 3, & Wii) 
The guitar for Rock Band 2 is nearly identical to its predecessor except for the fact that the coloring of the new guitar had a sunburst paint job. Minor improvements to the fret buttons (which made them quieter) and durability improvements to the strum bar. The Rock Band 2 guitar is backward compatible with Rock Band.

Rock Band 3 (Xbox 360, PlayStation 3 & Wii) 
Rock Band 3 was the beginning of merging professional instruments and the classic guitar design for rhythm games. Harmonix developed a pro-styled guitar, a guitar bass, and Premium/Limited Edition replica 5-button fret guitars. As well as an improved version of their Stratocaster guitar.

The Pro-style guitar came in two different colors, black and red, and resembled a Fender Mustang. Instead of the original 5 fret button and strum bar setup that the previous models had. The Pro-style guitar would have 6 rows and 17 different frets, totaling in 102 buttons, and a string box, which had 6 stainless steel strings. The player would have to play this guitar as if it was a real one, requiring them to press a button and strum the correct string at the same time.

The bass guitar which was designed like a normal bass guitar, with a legacy design of having 5 fret buttons and a strum bar, had 2 strum bars since many bass guitar players would play with two fingers when they strum. Also, there is no whammy bar since bass players don't use a whammy. The bass guitar would also be offered in 3 different colors. Those being a seafoam green, candy apple red, and white.

The Premium/Limited Edition guitars would still resemble a Fender Stratocaster, but would not be a scale replica of it with a Wooden design and the original design as well. The guitars also got a durability improvement to the fret buttons and strum bar.

Rock Band 4 (Xbox One, PlayStation 4) 
As stated by Harmonix, they did not want to “reinvent the wheel”. The guitar for Rock Band 4 would still be the same original Fender Stratocaster design, but with improvements to the fret buttons and strum bar.

In 2016, Harmonix switched their hardware developers and since Harmonix was coming out with a new DLC for Rock Band 4, rivals, they made a new guitar controller. This one would resemble a Fender Jaguar. It also featured an optional rechargeable battery pack as well as a charging stand.

The Beatles: Rock Band (Xbox 360, PlayStation 3, Wii) 
The Beatles: Rock Band would have the same layout as the guitar from Rock Band 2, but the design is different. Harmonix had developed three different guitars. Each console had the guitars. One of the guitars would resemble a Rickenbacker 325. Another would resemble a Gretsch Duo Jet. The last one would resemble a Höfner Bass.

Use as a musical instrument

Numerous attempts have been made to adapt Guitar Controllers for use as legitimate musical instruments. These attempts range from simple solutions that output a single note or sound for each button on the controller, to more complicated applications, such as MIDItar Hero and Armchair Guitarist that attempt to fully adapt the controller to use as an instrument, with a wide range of notes and playing styles.

Use as a controller for other games 
Guitar controllers are not just used for playing Guitar Hero and Rock Band. Video game streamer Benjamin "Bearzly" Gwin used a Rock Band guitar to complete Dark Souls. Gwin stated on his Reddit Post "This was done on PC using x360ce to remap the guitar controller" and a picture was posted of how he converted his controls.

References

Game controllers
Guitar Hero
Rock Band series